Mediator of RNA polymerase II transcription subunit 31 is a protein in humans  encoded by the MED31 gene. It represents subunit Med31 of the Mediator complex. The family contains the Saccharomyces cerevisiae SOH1 homologues. SOH1 is responsible for the repression of temperature sensitive growth of the HPR1 mutant and has been found to be a component of the RNA polymerase II transcription complex. SOH1 not only interacts with factors involved in DNA repair, but transcription as well. Thus, the SOH1 protein may serve to couple these two processes.

References

Further reading

Protein families